Operation Wilfred was a British naval operation during the Second World War that involved the mining of the channel between Norway and its offshore islands to prevent the transport of Swedish iron ore through neutral Norwegian waters to be used to sustain the German war effort. The Allies assumed that Wilfred would provoke a German response in Norway and prepared a separate operation known as Plan R 4 to occupy Narvik and other important locations.

On 8 April 1940, the operation was partly carried out, but was overtaken by events as a result of the following day's German invasion of Norway and Denmark (Operation Weserübung), which instead began the Norwegian Campaign.

Background
With the outbreak of war on 3 September 1939, Britain and France initiated a naval blockade to weaken Germany by depriving it of the vital imports needed to sustain its war effort. One of the most crucial of these was iron ore, needed to manufacture the steel which was used to build ships, tanks and aircraft for the German armed forces. The primary source of that commodity was neutral Sweden, deliveries from which Winston Churchill, then First Lord of the Admiralty was intent on preventing to restrict Germany's ability to fight. To do so, he developed a plan to mine the Norwegian Corridor, the sheltered sea lanes along Norway's craggy western coast used by the German ships to transport the ore within neutral waters back to their home ports. By doing so, Churchill hoped to force the ore ships out into the open sea where the blockading ships of Contraband Control could sink or capture them.

Britain and France were anxious to prevent a German takeover of Scandinavia that would greatly reduce the effectiveness of the blockade and secure indefinite supplies of iron ore. Such a move would also provide the Germans with many more sea ports and bases from which they could fly bombing and reconnaissance missions over Britain. To prevent that from happening, the Allies considered their own occupation of the two neutral countries, but the plan eventually came to nothing.

By late March 1940, the plan to mine the Norwegian waters, which Churchill had been urging his colleagues to authorise but for a variety of reasons had still not been carried out, had become linked with a separate plan to send naval mines down the Rhine to destroy German pontoon bridges, barges and shipping further downstream. The latter plan, known as Operation Royal Marine, was seen by the British as a way of striking back for the heavy damage and loss of life the Germans had inflicted on them by the use of the magnetic mine, but the French vetoed the plan for fear that it would bring a wider German retaliation against them.

On 3 April, the British began to receive reports of a heavy buildup of shipping and troops in the Baltic German ports of Rostock, Stettin and Swinemunde. It was assumed that it was part of a force being sent to counter an Allied move against Scandinavia (the Germans had some awareness of Allied plans as a result of their own intelligence) and so that day, the British took the decision to proceed with the mining of the iron ore route separately from Operation Royal Marine, setting a date of 8 April for the Admiralty to implement it.

Envisaging that Operation Wilfred would provoke a furious enemy response notwithstanding the preparations already underway in their Baltic ports, a parallel initiative, Plan R4, was ordered to prevent German landings by sending strong British and French forces to occupy the key Norwegian ports of Narvik, Stavanger, Bergen and Trondheim before they marched to the Swedish frontier and took control of the iron ore sites.

Because it seemed relatively minor and innocent in scope, the plan was named Operation Wilfred, after a naïve character in the long running Daily Mirror newspaper comic strip Pip, Squeak and Wilfred.

Operation
On 3 April, four cruisers (and ) sailed to Rosyth to embark units of the Royal Lincolnshire Regiment, troops that would be transported to Norway as part of the Plan R4 if deemed necessary. Additional troops embarked onto transport ships in the Clyde with further troops, held in readiness until indications of German intentions justified sending them to Norway.

On 5 April a large force of warships, escorted by the battlecruiser  and the cruiser  and comprising elements of both Operation Wilfred and Plan R4 set out from the main British naval base at Scapa Flow and sailed towards the Norwegian coast.

The plan was to lay two minefields. The first was to be just below the Lofoten Islands in the mouth of the Vestfjorden, the channel leading directly to the port of Narvik to which the iron ore was shipped (Operation WV). The second was to be approximately three fourths of the way down the western Norwegian coast, immediately adjacent to the peninsula of Stadtlandet, on a line of latitude roughly midway between the Faroes and Iceland (Operation WS). As a diversion, laying of a third minefield would be simulated just off the Bud headland, south of Kristiansund (Operation WB). On 7 April, the force split, one to carry on to Narvik, the others to carry out the operations to the south.

The British ships were given orders in case of Norwegian involvement: If the Norwegians swept the minefields, the British would lay new ones close by. If the Norwegians challenged the British ships, the latter were to inform them that they were there to protect merchant vessels. The British would then withdraw, leaving the Norwegians to guard the area. The ships allocated to the individual operations were as follows:

Force WV (Mouth of Vestfjord)
  – Renown-class battlecruiser
  – "G"-class destroyer
  – "G"-class destroyer
  – minelaying destroyer
  – minelaying destroyer
  – minelaying destroyer
  – minelaying destroyer
  – escort destroyer
  – escort destroyer
  – escort destroyer
  – escort destroyer

Force WB – (Bud headland)
  – Town"-class light cruiser
  – "H"-class minelaying destroyer. Initially part of Renown escort screen
  – "H"-class minelaying destroyer. Initially part of Renown escort screen

Force WS (Off Stadtlandet)
  – 5,087 ton auxiliary minelayer
  – "I"-class minelaying destroyer leader
  – "I"-class minelaying destroyer
  – "I"-class minelaying destroyer
  – "I"-class minelaying destroyer

In the event, only one minefield was actually laid. As the WS force sailed to its destination on 7 April, German ships were sighted in the Heligoland Bight on passage to Norway, and the mine-laying off Stadtlandet was cancelled. Early the next day, 8 April, the designated day for the mining to be carried out, Britain informed the Norwegian authorities of its intention to lay the mines inside their territorial waters. Soon afterward, Force WB simulated minelaying off the Bud headland by using oil drums and patrolled the area to "warn" shipping of the danger. Force WV duly carried out its task and laid the minefield in the mouth of Vestfjord. At 05:15 that morning, the Allies broadcast a statement to the world that justified their action and defined the minefield areas. The Norwegian government issued a strong protest and demanded their immediate removal, but the German fleet was already advancing up their coasts. Then, events moved so quickly that the issue of the minefields became largely irrelevant.

Later that day, an iron ore ship (sailing from Stettin, in northern Germany) was sunk in the Skagerrak by the Polish submarine . The ship was carrying troops, horses and tanks for the German invasion of Norway, part of Operation Weserübung. Around half of the 300 men on board were drowned, with the survivors telling the crews of the Norwegian fishing boats that picked them up that they were on their way to Bergen to defend it from the British. A few hours later, two other German ships (the Posidonia and the Krete) were also sunk in the same area.

Aftermath
Operation Wilfred was now essentially complete and so the southern Force WS and WB ships rejoined the Home Fleet to undertake screening duties, military support and convoy defence, as part of the general British response to the German move on Norway known as Operation Rupert. The northern WV force immediately became embroiled in the early actions of the British attempt to thwart the German landings.

HMS Glowworm, which had become detached from the main force on 6 April to look for a man lost overboard, encountered the German heavy cruiser  and carried out a torpedo attack. After receiving return fire and heavy damage, she rammed Admiral Hipper and sank soon afterwards with 111 men killed. Her commander, Lieutenant-Commander Gerard Broadmead Roope was awarded a posthumous Victoria Cross. Although damage was inflicted by both sides, the Germans failed to take their opportunity to sink the older and slower British battlecruiser.

Despite news of those actions and indications from other sources, the Norwegians were still caught largely unprepared for the attack early the next day. The invasion proper began with German landings of troops in the main Norwegian settlements of Stavanger, Oslo, Trondheim, Narvik and Bergen. The same day (9 April), Icarus sank the Europa, another German iron ore carrier that was being used to transport men and equipment to Norway, and the 2nd Destroyer Flotilla, which had taken part in the mining of the Vestfjord, later fought with other British naval units in the 1st Battle of Narvik, sinking several German warships.

On 11 April, while furious naval battles were still underway off the Norwegian coast, Churchill made a speech in the House of Commons about the current situation and justified Operation Wilfred:

British and French troops landed at Narvik on 14 April to assist the Norwegians, pushing the Germans out of the town and almost forcing them to surrender. Despite further Allied landings took place between 18 and 23 April, the Norwegians surrendered on 9 June 1940.

Ironically, although Operation Wilfred was essentially a failure in that it did not prevent the Germans from having access to the iron ore, once Norway became occupied by Germany, it was no longer neutral territory and so British ships and aircraft were free to enter its territorial waters and to attack German ships at will.

See also 
 Operation Catherine (proposed Baltic operation)

Footnotes

Further reading
 
 

Norwegian campaign
1940 in Norway
Military operations directly affecting Sweden during World War II
Maritime incidents in Norway
Norway–United Kingdom relations
Mine warfare